Zagłębie Lubin is a Polish football club, based in Lubin. During the 2013–14 campaign they competed in the Ekstraklasa and in the Polish Cup.

Competitions

Ekstraklasa

Regular season

League table

Relegation round

League table

References 

Zaglebie Lubin
Zaglebie Lubin
Zagłębie Lubin seasons